Frank Spottiswoode Aitken (16 April 1868 – 26 February 1933) was a Scottish-American actor of the silent era. He played Dr. Cameron in D. W. Griffith's epic drama The Birth of a Nation.

Early years
Aitken was born 16 April 1868 in Edinburgh, Scotland.

Acting
In his book, The King of the Movies: Film Pioneer Siegmund Lubin, Joseph P. Eckhardt wrote that Aitken was "trained as a Shakespearean actor, with many years of experience under his belt." His film debut came in 1911. He eventually appeared in 81 feature films between 1914 and 1927.

Businessman

Aitken was one of the first actors to settle in Los Angeles when the film industry was still at its strongest in New York. He invested most of his earnings in real estate, buying up orange groves around what would become Hollywood.

Personal life
Aitken was involved in a controversy in 1922 when, after suing his wife Marion Dana Jones for divorce for alleged infidelity, she countersued. A United Press news story reported that she was "alleging her husband had coerced her into living with Hay Weinstein, wealthy Santa Barbaran, so that he could extort money from Weinstein."

The couple had three children: Francis Spottiswoode Aitken Jr., Frances Aitken and Margaret Shirley Aitken.

Death
Aitken died 24 February 1933 in Los Angeles, California. He was 64 years old. He is buried in the Hollywood Forever Cemetery.

Partial filmography

 The Battle (1911, Short) - Minor Role
 The Sands of Dee (1912, Short)
 The Green-Eyed Devil (1914, Short)
 Home, Sweet Home (1914) - James Smith - Mary's Father
 The Girl in the Shack (1914, Short) - Jenny's Father - the Sheriff
 The Angel of Contention (1914, Short) - Nettie's Father
 The Avenging Conscience (1914) - The Uncle
 The Birth of a Nation (1915) - Dr. Cameron
 The Outcast (1915) - The Lawyer
 The Outlaw's Revenge (1915) - The Soothsayer
 Captain Macklin (1915, Short) - General Laquerre
 Her Shattered Idol (1915) - Colonel Nutt - Mae's Uncle
 The Price of Power (1916) - Gabriel Brooks - Maisie's Father
 Acquitted (1916) - Charles Ryder
 The Flying Torpedo (1916) - Bartholomew Thompson
 Macbeth (1916) - Duncan
 An Innocent Magdalene (1916) - Col. Raleigh
 Intolerance (1916) - Brown Eyes's Father
 The Old Folks at Home (1916) - Judge
 The Wharf Rat (1916) - Carl Wagner
 The Americano (1916) - Presidente Hernando de Valdez
 Pathways of Life (1916, Short) - Daddy Wisdom
 Stage Struck (1917) - The Judge
 A Woman's Awakening (1917) - Judge Cotter
 Cheerful Givers (1917) - Rev. John Deady
 Souls Triumphant (1917) - Josiah Vale
 Melissa of the Hills (1917) - Jethro Stark
 Charity Castle (1917) - Lucius Garrett
 Her Country's Call (1917) - Dr. Downie
 Southern Pride (1917) - Father Mort
 A Game of Wits (1917) - Silas Stone
 Beauty and the Rogue (1918) - Benjamin Wilson
 The Mating of Marcella (1918) - Jose Duranzo
 How Could You Jean? (1918) - Rufus Bonner
 In Judgement Of (1918) - Mr. Manners
 The Cruise of the Make-Believes (1918) - Simon Quarle
 Jane Goes A-Wooing (1919) - David Lyman
 The Secret Garden (1919) - Archibald Craven
 Who Cares? (1919) - Mr. Ludlow
 Fighting Through (1919) - Col. DuBrey Carter
 The Wicked Darling (1919) - Fadem
 Captain Kidd, Jr. (1919) - Augus MacTavish
 The White Heather (1919) - James Hume
 Caleb Piper's Girl (1919) - Caleb Piper
 An Innocent Adventuress (1919) - Meekton
 Hay Foot, Straw Foot (1919) - Thaddeus Briggs
 Evangeline (1919) - Benedict Bellefontaine
 Rough Riding Romance (1919) - The King
 The Broken Commandments (1919) - Mr. Banard
 Her Kingdom of Dreams (1919) - David Rutledge
 Bonnie Bonnie Lassie (1919) - Jeremiah Wishart
 The Thunderbolt (1919) - Allan Pomeroy
 A Woman of Pleasure (1919) - Wilberforce Pace
 Witch's Gold (1920)
 The White Circle (1920) - Bernard Huddlestone
 Nomads of the North (1920) - Old Roland
 Dangerous Love (1920) - The Father
 The Unknown Wife (1921) - Henry Wilburton
 Reputation (1921) - Karl
 At the End of the World (1921)
 Beyond (1921) - Rufus Southerne
 The Man of Courage (1922) - Stephen Gregory
 The Trap (1922) - The Factor
 Monte Cristo (1922) - Abbé Faria
 The Snowshoe Trail (1922) - John Lounsbury
 Manslaughter (1922) - Member of the Jury (uncredited)
 The Young Rajah (1922) - Caleb
 One Wonderful Night (1922) - Minister
 A Dangerous Game (1922) - Edward Peebles
 Around the World in Eighteen Days (1923) - Piggott
 Merry-Go-Round (1923) - Minister of War / Gisella's Father
 Six Days (1923) - Pere Jerome
 The Love Pirate (1923) - Cyrus Revere
 Pioneer's Gold (1924) - Bob Hartley
 Triumph (1924) - Torrini
 Lure of the Yukon (1924) - Sourdough McCraig
 The Fire Patrol (1924) - Captain John Ferguson
 Gerald Cranston's Lady (1924) - Ephraim Brewster
 Those Who Dare (1924) - Thorne Wtherell
 The Coast Patrol (1925) - Capt. Slocum
 The Handicap (1925) - Henrietta's Grandfather
 The Goose Woman (1925) - Jacob Rigg
 The Eagle (1925) - Dubrovsky's Father (uncredited)
 Accused (1925) - Eagle Eye
 The Power of the Weak (1926) - The Father
 The Two-Gun Man (1926) - Dad Randall
 Roaring Fires (1927) - Calvert Carter
 The Power of the Press (1928) - Sports Writer (final film role)

References

External links

1868 births
1933 deaths
Scottish male film actors
Scottish male silent film actors
American male film actors
American male silent film actors
Scottish emigrants to the United States
Male actors from Edinburgh
Burials at Hollywood Forever Cemetery
20th-century American male actors
20th-century Scottish male actors